František Huf (born 1981 in Olomouc, Czechoslovakia) is a Czech bodybuilder and model.

He weighs  in the off-season. He won the Grand Prix Fitness Nutrend in 2005. He is Lukáš Osladil's protégé.

Private life
He married in 2006, and the couple had a son named Samuel František in 2008.

Awards 

 1997 - 1st Mr. Czech Republic younger adolescents in Hronov
 1998 - 1st Mr. Moravy and Silesian adolescents in Zbýšov
 1998 - 1st Mr. Czech Republic adolescents in Zlín
 1999 - 1st Mr. Moravy and Silesian adolescents in Zbýšov
 1999 - 1st Mr. Czech Republic in Čelákovice
 1999 - 1st Mr. Czech Republic junior in Zbýšov
 1999 - 4th Mr. The International Cup Competition for Men in Slovensko
 2001 - 1st Mr. World Jr., in Španělsko in Alicante
 2002 - 1st Mr. Junior Czech Republic in Jaroměř
 2003 - Transfer between male categories
 2005 - 1st Mr. + The Absolute Winner of the Grand Prix Nutrend
 2007 - 3rd Mr. European Championship in Baku in Azerbaijan
 2007 - 1st Mr. Grand Prix Vyškov
 2007 - 1st Mr. Grand Prix Opava
 2007 - 1st Mr. Prague Cup + Absolute winner
 2007 - 3rd Mr. World Championship in Barcelona

References

External links 

  

1981 births
Living people
Czech bodybuilders
People from Olomouc